Haripur is municipality in Sarlahi District, a part of Province No. 2 in Nepal. It was formed in 2017 occupying current 9 sections (wards) from previous 9 former VDCs. It occupies an area of 66.86 km2 with a total population of 47,187.

References 

Populated places in Sarlahi District
Nepal municipalities established in 2017
Municipalities in Madhesh Province